Karima Kibble (born Karima Trotter) is a Gospel singer, and a founding member of the gospel group Virtue.

Early years
A native of New Orleans, Louisiana, Karima was the fifth child born into the Trotter family.

Musical career
She sings soprano and alto  with Virtue where she currently performs with her sisters Ebony Holland and Heather Martin. She is the lead singer in the group. 

She has appeared on the album Dream by BeBe Winans and sang background for the song "No Tears" on Lil iROCC Williams's self-titled debut album. She sings "Rainbow Maker" on the compilation album With this Ring. This song is a duet with her husband Joey Kibble.

On September 22, 2009, Karima released her debut solo album Just Karima.

Discography

Studio albums

Singles

As a lead artist

Album appearances

See also
Virtue
Worship music
List of Christian worship music artists

External links
Cross Rhythms Artist Profile – Virtue
Richard De La Font Agency, Inc - Artist Booking
Crossmap Biography

References

1974 births
Living people
American gospel singers
Urban contemporary gospel musicians
American performers of Christian music
Musicians from New Orleans
Singers from Louisiana
21st-century American women singers
21st-century American singers